The Vientiane Treaty was a cease-fire agreement between the two warring factions in the Laotian Civil War (the Kingdom of Laos and the communist Pathet Lao), signed in Vientiane (the capital of Laos), on 21 February 1973.

The Vientiane Treaty was in some sense a corollary to the Paris Peace Accords, signed the month before, which had ended U.S. involvement in the Vietnam war. Just as the Paris Accords had mandated the withdrawal of all US forces in Vietnam, the Vientiane Treaty called for the removal from Laos of all foreign forces allied to each side.

Under the terms of the treaty, a new coalition government was to be created; security in major cities (such as Vientiane) was to be undertaken by joint forces from both sides.

There were no outside guarantees to the terms, as the agreement was only between the Lao factions; the ICC (which had overseen the 1954 Geneva Accords ending the First Indochina War) was more powerless than before to monitor compliance.

The coalition government envisaged by the treaty did not long outlast it; as with the treaty itself, events in Laos emulated those in Vietnam. Shortly after the fall of the South Vietnamese government on 30 April 1975, the Pathet Lao took over Laos on 15 August 1975.

External links
 History of Laos
 Pathet Lao Revolution in Laos

Peace treaties
1973 in Laos
Treaties of the Kingdom of Laos
Treaties concluded in 1973
20th century in Vientiane
1970s in Laos